Rodrigo Ost dos Santos (born August 2, 1988) is a Brazilian professional footballer who plays as an midfielder for Xagħra United.

Honours

Club 
Mitra Kukar
 General Sudirman Cup: 2015

References

External links
 Rodrigo Ost dos Santos at Soccerway

1988 births
Living people
Brazilian footballers
Association football midfielders
Xagħra United F.C. players
Arema F.C. players
Mitra Kukar players
Mogi Mirim Esporte Clube players
Itumbiara Esporte Clube players
Associação Desportiva Itaboraí players
Rio Preto Esporte Clube players
Esporte Clube Comercial (MS) players
Capivariano Futebol Clube players
Clube Atlético Sorocaba players
Footballers from São Paulo